Laats is a surname. Notable people with the surname include:

Johan Laats (born 1967), Belgian judoka
Lia Laats (1926–2004), Estonian stage and film actress
Philip Laats (born 1963), Belgian judoka

See also
Heli Lääts (1932–2018), Estonian singer
Laat, is a children's magazine in Sindhi published by Mehran Publication Hyderabad, Sindh

References

Estonian-language surnames
Dutch-language surnames